Redhouse is a surname. Notable people with the surname include:

 Diana Redhouse (1923–2007), British artist
 Harry Redhouse (1880–1959), English cricketer
 James Redhouse (1811–1892), British lexicographer

See also
Andrew Hamilton, Lord Redhouse ( 1565–1634), Scottish landowner